Siella is a village and seat of the commune of Siadougou in the San Cercle in the Ségou Region of southern-central Mali.

References

Populated places in Ségou Region